The 2023 King Tornadoes men's volleyball team represents King University in the 2023 NCAA Division I & II men's volleyball season. The Tornadoes, led by 14th year head coach Ryan Booher, were picked to finish second in the Conference Carolinas coaches preseason poll.

Season highlights
Will be filled in as the season progresses.

Roster

Schedule
TV/Internet Streaming information:
All home games will be streamed on Conference Carolinas DN. Most road games will also be televised or streamed by the schools television or streaming service.

 *-Indicates conference match.
 Times listed are Eastern Time Zone.

Announcers for televised games
Purdue Fort Wayne: Mike Maahs & Victoria Brisack
Lewis: Allie Lankowicz & Chloe Fornetti
Loyola Chicago: Scott Sudikoff & Ray Gooden
Quincy: 
Limestone: 
Charleston (WV): 
Tusculum: 
Fort Valley State: 
Lincoln Memorial: 
Queens: 
Fort Valley State: 
North Greenville: 
Emmanuel: 
Erskine: 
Lees-McRae: 
Belmont Abbey: 
George Mason: 
Mount Olive: 
Barton: 
Lincoln Memorial: 
Queens: 
McKendree: 
Lindenwood:
Belmont Abbey: 
NJIT: 
St. Francis: 
North Greenville: 
Erskine: 
Emmanuel: 
Barton: 
Mount Olive: 
Tusculum: 
Lees-McRae:

References

2023 in sports in Tennessee
2023 NCAA Division I & II men's volleyball season
King
King Tornado